Withy is the surname of:

 Arthur Withy (1870–1943), New Zealand journalist and political activist, son of Edward Withy
 Edward Withy (c. 1844–1927), English shipbuilder and New Zealand politician
 George Withy (1924–1998), English journalist, great nephew of Edward Withy
 Henry Withy (1852–1922), English shipbuilding manager, brother of Edward Withy